The Hilo Art Museum (HAM) was an effort in Hilo, Hawaii. The Museum became a Hawaii non-profit corporation on April 16, 2007. HAM was a member of the Western Museums Association and the Hawaii Museums Association. In 2007, the HAM Education Centers was opened to provide a program of studio art classes, workshops and special exhibits. Its main location closed in December 2007, and only a few classes in a donated space were held in 2008.

Collections and holdings
The Hilo Art Museum permanent collection included original works of art by Huc-Mazelet Luquiens, Pablo Picasso, Keith Haring, Jack Sudlow, Salvador Dalí, Stephen Freedman, Emily DuBois, Suzanne Dix, and many others. The Museum featured a permanent exhibit, "Art of the Holocaust and Genocide" which contains a rare signed lithograph by Picasso, works by Chagall and other significant artists.

The Museum Teaching Collection also featured a unique teaching collection of hand painted life sized reproductions of the masters. This collection was necessary to teach the island children about art in museums around the world. Isolation in the middle of the Pacific Ocean has kept most of the island inhabitants and their families from viewing the world's master art.

Hours and admissions
The Hilo Art Museum exhibited a portion of their collection in the Keaau Fine Arts Center, 16-643 Kipimana Street, in the Shipman Industrial Park, Keaau, Hawaii.

Hilo Art Museum Research Library
The Hilo Art Museum maintained a library of books on art topics.

History
In April 2007, artist and island resident, Ted Coombs, began to realize his dream of a general art museum in Hilo, Hawaii, the State's second largest city. He contacted several others he knew shared his dream, and formed the HAM Board of Trustees. A search began for a location, and for art to fill the permanent collection. Before finding a permanent home, the trustees decided it would be best to open the facility in the historic Hilo Iron Works building. This facility closed as of December 2007, with a new, smaller facility donated in January 2008, in Keaau.

The Hilo Iron Works building was home to the noted Art in the Iron Works gallery which maintained one of Hilo's premier art education resources. This program was generously donated to the Museum when the Museum took over the Art in the Iron Works facility in the Summer of 2007.

Donations of art began arriving including an original Picasso drawing of the "Two Monkeys", original work by abstract expressionist, Willem de Kooning, social commentary artist, Suzanne Dix and Dale Chihuly.

The initial funding for the museum came from the trustees, Ted Coombs and family, Stephen Davey, and through museum memberships.

In January 2008, the Hilo Art Museum began a program of opening small exhibit centers throughout the Island of Hawaii. The only center so far is the Keaau Fine Art Center which features portions of the permanent collection and rotating exhibits.

In February 2009, an exhibition featuring Italian artist Mirko was put on at the Hilo Palace Theater by the museum's Director, Stephen Davey.  These works, painted canvas and ceramic pieces, featured images true to the Hawaiian heritage.

In June 2009, the museum was closed for business.

Closed
The Hilo Art Museum Education Center was closed in December 2008. The Hilo Art Museum is no longer a member of the American Alliance of Museums, and never met the criteria for accreditation by the AAM.

References

External links
Ted Coombs' Home Page
Stephen Davey Official Site

Art museums established in 2007
Art museums disestablished in 2008
Art museums and galleries in Hawaii
Museums in Hilo, Hawaii
2007 establishments in Hawaii
2008 disestablishments in Hawaii
Defunct museums in Hawaii